Dic Jones (30 March 1934 – 18 August 2009), was a Welsh-language poet and Archdruid of the National Eisteddfod of Wales.

Career
Jones was born Richard Lewis Jones at Tre'r-ddôl in Ceredigion. The son of a farmer, he himself farmed  at Fferm yr Hendre at Blaenannerch in Aberporth. In commenting upon his life, he remarked, "I farm for bread and butter; I write for some jam on it."

Jones began his literary career as a competitor in the Urdd eisteddfod, where, as an exponent of cynghanedd, he won the chair five times in his twenties. In 1966 he won the Chair at the National Eisteddfod with an awdl entitled "Cynhaeaf" (meaning harvest).

In 1968, cameras from HTV filmed one of the first pieces of British reality television, when they followed Jones, his wife Jean, and three of their children, Delyth, Rhian and Dafydd, on a fortnight's holiday to San Antonio, Ibiza.

Under his bardic name "Dic yr Hendre", Jones was installed as Archdruid in 2007, succeeding Selwyn Iolen. He officiated at the 2008 event in Cardiff, but missed the 2009 event in Bala due to ill health.

Works

Agor Grwn (1960)
Caneuon Cynhaeaf (1969)
Storom Awst (1978)
Sgubo'r Storws (1986)
Golwg Arall (2001)
Golwg ar Gân (2002)
Cadw Golwg (2005)

References

1934 births
2009 deaths
Chaired bards
Welsh Eisteddfod archdruids
Welsh farmers
Welsh-language poets
20th-century Welsh poets